Philip Jacob may refer to:
 Philip Jacob (rugby union)
 Philip Jacob (priest)